A number of steamships were named Afoundria, including –

  (MC hull number 476), a Type C2-S-E1 ships, transferred to the United States Navy as  USS Wayne (APA-54); sold for commercial use in 1947; converted to container ship in 1958; scrapped in 1977
  (MC hull number 483), a Type C2-S-E1 ships, converted to troopship March 1944, WSA operation to March 1945, converted to container ship in 1966; scrapped in 1979

Ship names